This is a List of European Championships medalists in sailing.

12 Metre

49er

49er FX

470

Open

Men and Mixed

Men

Women

Dragon

Finn

IQFoil

Men

Women

J/70

Laser

Laser Radial

Men

Women

Nacra 17

OK

RS:X

Men

Women

Snipe

Soling

Star

See also
EUROSAF

References

Lists of European Championships medalists in sailing